Theretra monteironis is a moth of the family Sphingidae. It is known from dry habitats from KwaZulu-Natal to eastern Kenya.

The length of the forewings is 20–23 mm and the wingspan is 48–62 mm. It is very similar to Theretra perkeo, but the ground colour is pale brown without a trace of pink. The pale lines and stripes on the wings and body are much more prominent and almost silvery.

The larvae feed on the leaves of Zantedeschia aethiopica.

References

Theretra
Moths described in 1882
Moths of Africa